Andy Roddick was the defending champion, but chose not to participate that year.

Roger Federer won in the final 6–1, 6–3, against Stanislas Wawrinka.

Players

Draw

Main draw

Play-offs

External links
Official AAMI Classic website

Kooyong Classic
AAMI